Venezuela is competing at the 2013 World Aquatics Championships in Barcelona, Spain between 19 July and 4 August 2013.

Diving

Venezuela qualified six quota places for the following diving events.

Men

Women

Open water swimming

Venezuela qualified five quota places for the following events in open water swimming.

Swimming

Venezuelan swimmers achieved qualifying standards in the following events (up to a maximum of 2 swimmers in each event at the A-standard entry time, and 1 at the B-standard):

Men

Women

Synchronized swimming

Venezuela has qualified the following synchronized swimmers.

References

External links
Barcelona 2013 Official Site
Federación Venezolana de Deportes Acuáticos 

Nations at the 2013 World Aquatics Championships
2013 in Venezuelan sport
Venezuela at the World Aquatics Championships